Sesleria insularis is a species of perennial grass in the family Poaceae, with culms 30–65 cm long.

Synonyms 
 Sesleria caerulea var. corsica Hack.
 Sesleria caerulea var. italica Pamp.
 Sesleria corsica (Hack.) Ujhelyi
 Sesleria insularis subsp. barbaricina Arrigoni
 Sesleria insularis subsp. italica (Pamp.) Deyl
 Sesleria insularis subsp. morisiana Arrigoni
 Sesleria insularis subsp. sillingeri (Deyl) Deyl
 Sesleria paparistoi Ujhelyi
 Sesleria sillingeri Deyl
 Sesleria skipetarum Ujhelyi

References 

 Kew GrassBase entry
 The Plant List entry
 Encyclopedia of Life entry

insularis